Daniel John Tyminski (born June 20, 1967) is an American bluegrass composer, vocalist, and instrumentalist. He is a member of Alison Krauss's band Union Station, and has released three solo albums, Carry Me Across the Mountain (2000), on the Doobie Shea Records label, Wheels (2008), on the Rounder Records label, and Southern Gothic (2017). on the Mercury Records label.

He is known for his updated version of the song "Man of Constant Sorrow," which was featured in the movie O Brother, Where Art Thou? and won the 2001 CMA award for best single as well as a Grammy Award for best Country Collaboration with Vocals (along with Harley Allen and Pat Enright, filling out the vocals for the movie's Soggy Bottom Boys). In total, he has won 14 Grammy Awards for solo and collaborative projects. In 2013, he was the vocalist on Avicii's international hit "Hey Brother" from the album True. Tyminski received the Bluegrass Star Award from the Bluegrass Heritage Foundation of Dallas, Texas, in 2021. The award is bestowed upon bluegrass artists who do an exemplary job of advancing traditional bluegrass music while preserving its character and heritage.

Musical career
While Alison Krauss and Union Station were on hiatus, owing to Alison Krauss' tour with Robert Plant, Tyminski formed his own group, the Dan Tyminski Band. The ensemble featured Tyminski on guitar, Ron Stewart on banjo, Adam Steffey on mandolin, Justin Moses on fiddle and dobro, and Barry Bales on upright bass. An album, entitled Wheels, was released on Rounder Records in June 2008. Tyminski played Martin and Bourgeois guitars and Sim Daley played mandolins. In July 2009 the Martin Guitar Company issued, as part of their Custom Artist Series, a D28 Dreadnought acoustic guitar in recognition of Dan's life devoted to performing bluegrass and old-time music. The guitar, named Martin D-28 Dan Tyminski Custom Edition, was issued with its own distinctive details to appeal to flatpickers. For many years Dan's primary guitar has been a well worn 1946 Martin D-28.

At the Ultra Music Festival 2013, he premiered a new single, "Hey Brother", as part of a country-electronic collaboration with Swedish producer Avicii. The song was a Top 5 hit in more than 15 countries, including Australia, Austria, Belgium, Denmark, Finland, Germany, the Netherlands, New Zealand, Norway, Sweden, Switzerland, Slovakia, Macedonia and the United Kingdom.

In 2017, Tyminski announced a new solo album, Southern Gothic, which was released via Mercury Records Nashville. The lead single was "Bloodline".

Tyminski is an avid golfer, and was named to Golf Digest's "Top 100 Golfers in Music." He regularly competes at celebrity golf tournaments, including the Monday After Masters tournament in Myrtle Beach, SC, the Murray Bros. Caddyshack tournament in St. Augustine, FL, and The Vinny golf tournament in Nashville, TN.

Discography

Albums

Singles

As featured artist

Filmography
 O Brother, Where Art Thou? – Ulysses Everett McGill (singing voice)

References

Notes
 A  "Hey Brother" officially credited only to Avicii.

Sources

External links
 
The Dan Tyminski Band
Dan Tyminski Interview with CountryMusicPride.com CountryMusicPride.com

1967 births
Alison Krauss & Union Station members
American bluegrass musicians
American country guitarists
American country singer-songwriters
American male singer-songwriters
Living people
People from Rutland (city), Vermont
Singers from Vermont
Grammy Award winners
American bluegrass guitarists
American male guitarists
Country musicians from Vermont
Guitarists from Vermont
20th-century American guitarists
20th-century American male musicians
Lonesome River Band members